The P22 is a semi-automatic pistol chambered for .22 LR (5.6 mm) rimfire ammunition. Manufactured by Carl Walther GmbH Sportwaffen, it was introduced in 2002.

Operation

The P22 operates by blowback where pressure generated by a firing cartridge is countered by a combination of the inertial weight of the slide assembly and the force of the recoil spring. The action will not open until the projectile has left the barrel and the pressures have dropped to safe levels. The gun will not cycle efficiently unless high velocity .22 (5.6 mm) rounds are used.

Criminal use
A Walther P22 was one of the weapons used in the 2007 Virginia Tech shooting.

A Walther P22 was the weapon used in the 2008 Kauhajoki school shooting.

See also
 Walther P99
 Walther PK380
 Walther SP22
 Ruger SR22

References

External links

.22 LR pistols
Walther semi-automatic pistols
Semi-automatic pistols of Germany